Anees Bazmee is an Indian film director, screenwriter and producer known for his works in Indian cinema.

Early life
Born to Urdu poet Abdul Hameed ‘Nerang’ Bazmee into a Gujarati Muslim family, Bazmee began as a child actor in movies like Kitaab (1977) before becoming an assistant director for Raj Kapoor's Prem Rog (1982) and then a screenwriter with Swarg (1990).

Career 
Bazmee did his directorial debut with Hulchul in 1995, however his first commercial success in came in 1998 with the film Pyaar To Hona Hi Tha, one of the highest-grossing Bollywood films of the year. He achieved further success as well as recognition by directing the top-grossing comedies including No Entry (2005), Welcome (2007), Singh Is Kinng (2008), Ready (2011),  Welcome Back (2015), Bhool Bhulaiyaa 2 (2022) and also received praise for directing the moderately successful romantic thriller Deewangee (2002). His film which he completed in 2004, titled Naam was set to be released in 2022.

Filmography

As director

As writer

As actor

References

External links 
 
 

Indian Muslims
Indian male child actors
20th-century Indian film directors
Hindi-language film directors
Living people
Indian male screenwriters
Film directors from Gujarat
21st-century Indian film directors
1962 births